Perfecto Rivas Yasay Jr. (January 27, 1947June 12, 2020) was a Philippine government official who served as Secretary of Foreign Affairs of the Philippines under the Duterte administration in an ad interim basis from June 30, 2016, until March 8, 2017, the rejection of his appointment by the Commission on Appointments over eligibility concerns resulting from questions on his citizenship.

He served as chairman of the Securities and Exchange Commission (SEC) and was Bangon Pilipinas Party's vice-presidential candidate in the 2010 Philippine elections, running alongside Eddie Villanueva.

Early life and education
Yasay was born on January 27, 1947, to Perfecto Yasay Sr., a pastor, and Deborah Rivas, a public school teacher, in Kidapawan, North Cotabato. He finished his secondary education at Davao City High School in 1963 and received his Bachelor of Arts in political science at Central Philippine University, Iloilo City in 1967. He earned his law degree at the University of the Philippines Diliman.

Career

Legal work
Yasay became a member of the Bar of the state of New York and of the United States Supreme Court. While in New York, he was managing director of the Maceda Philippine News from 1983 to 1987 and senior partner at two law firms—Maceda, Yasay & Tolentino, Esqs., and Yasay & De Castro, Esqs.—from 1979 to 1990. In the Philippines, he was commissioner of San Jose, Yasay & Santos Law Offices from 1987 to 1993.

SEC chairman
In 1993, he was assigned as associate commissioner of SEC. He was chairman from 1995 to 2000.

Estrada impeachment trial
Yasay was among those who testified in the impeachment trial against President Joseph Estrada on charges of corruption. The probe led to the ouster of Estrada, known as EDSA People Power II in 2001.

On February 15, 2010, Yasay apologized to Estrada for "hurting and offending him" but clarified that this was not a retraction of his testimony on the deposed president's "abuse of authority and corruption."

2004 senatorial bid 
He ran for a Senate seat in the 2004 Election under Aksyon Demokratiko but lost.

2010 vice presidential bid
On November 29, 2009, he accepted the nomination of the Bangon Pilipinas Party to be its candidate for vice president as the running mate of Jesus is Lord Church founder and president Eddie Villanueva. Among his campaign platform points, Yasay conveyed that the practice of using big-name endorsers should be stopped because it makes the elections a matter of money and popularity. He also said that the voters will only base their votes via the endorsers of the candidate, and that the biggest setback in the fight against corruption was the quick pardon of Joseph Estrada. Yasay lost to Makati City Mayor Jejomar Binay in the vice-presidential elections.

Secretary of Foreign Affairs

He accepted the offer of President Rodrigo Duterte to join his Cabinet on May 18, 2016. During his tenure he represented the Duterte administration's policy of an "independent foreign policy" distancing the Philippines from the United States. According to Yasay, the United States had used a "carrot and stick" foreign policy in regard to the Philippines since for their own interest to the detriment of the latter. Yasay was meant by Duterte to serve the post until mid-2017, when Duterte planned to appoint his running mate, Senator Alan Peter Cayetano, as his successor. On March 8, 2017, however, Yasay's appointment was rejected by a unanimous vote of 15–0 by the Commission on Appointments due to questions about his Philippine citizenship status after a period of United States citizenship.

Board memberships and philanthropy

He was chairman of the Board of Trustees of Philippine Christian University and Central Philippine University.

Death
Yasay died on June 12, 2020, in San Juan, Metro Manila, due to complications from pneumonia according to his wife. His wife clarified, however, that his pneumonia was a complication from cancer recurrence rather than COVID-19, the latter disease being the cause of a pandemic affecting the world at the time of Yasay's death.

Personal life
He was married to former Population Commission executive director Cecile Joaquin and had three children, all United States citizens. He had American citizenship until 2016, but had yet to retake the Philippine oath of citizenship; there was debate whether he was stateless or not.

See also
 List of foreign ministers in 2017

References

External links
 Perfecto Yasay Jr.'s website
 About Perfecto Yasay Jr.
 Erap feels vindicated Yasay's apology

1947 births
2020 deaths
Ateneo de Manila University alumni
American businesspeople
20th-century American lawyers
American people of Filipino descent
Bangon Pilipinas politicians
Central Philippine University alumni
Central Philippine University people
Duterte administration cabinet members
Estrada administration personnel
20th-century Filipino businesspeople
20th-century Filipino lawyers
21st-century Filipino politicians
Heads of government agencies of the Philippines
People from San Juan, Metro Manila
Ramos administration personnel
Secretaries of Foreign Affairs of the Philippines
University of the Philippines alumni
Former United States citizens
Deaths from cancer in the Philippines
Deaths from pneumonia in the Philippines